is an Echizen Railway Mikuni Awara Line railway station located in the site of Sakai, Fukui Prefecture, Japan.

Lines

Station layout
The station consists of one side platform and one island platform connected to the station building by a level crossing. The station is unattended.

Adjacent stations

History
On September 1, 1942 the Keifuku Electric Railway merged with Mikuni Awara Electric Railway and adsorbed the Maruoka Railway on December 1, 1944. The Maruoka Line was abolished on July 11, 1968. Operations were halted from June 25, 2001. The station reopened on August 10, 2003 as an Echizen Railway station. It was renamed to its present name on March 25, 2017.

Passenger statistics
In fiscal 2015, the station was used by an average of 165 passengers daily (boarding passengers only).

Surrounding area
The area is mostly rice fields with scattered farming settlements. Fukui Prefectural Route 5 is 300 meters west.
Other points of interest include:
Sakai City Ōishi Elementary School
Yurinosato Park

See also
 List of railway stations in Japan

References

External links

  

Railway stations in Fukui Prefecture
Railway stations in Japan opened in 1928
Mikuni Awara Line
Sakai, Fukui